Itzhak Luria (born 3 November 1940) is an Israeli former swimmer. He competed in two events at the 1960 Summer Olympics.

References

External links
 

1940 births
Living people
Israeli male swimmers
Olympic swimmers of Israel
Swimmers at the 1960 Summer Olympics
Place of birth missing (living people)